Aquarium station may refer to:
Aquarium station (MBTA), Boston, Massachusetts, U.S.
Aquarium station (River Line), Camden, New Jersey, U.S.

See also
 Aquarium (disambiguation)